Phil D'Auvergne (born 23 June 1950) is a New Zealand cricketer. He played in five first-class matches for Canterbury from 1969 to 1979.

See also
 List of Canterbury representative cricketers

References

External links
 

1950 births
Living people
New Zealand cricketers
Canterbury cricketers
Cricketers from Invercargill